Pyrgula annulata is a species of freshwater snail with a gill and an operculum, an aquatic gastropod mollusk in the family Hydrobiidae.

Pyrgula annulata is the type species of the genus Pyrgula.

Distribution 
This species occurs in Switzerland, Italy, Croatia, and Albania.

References

External links 

 AnimalBase info
 black and white drawings of shell:
 Adams H. & Adams A. 1858. The genera of recent Mollusca: arranged according to their organization. plate 32 figure 7.
 Call R. E. & Pilsbry H. A. 1886. On Pyrgulopsis, a new genus of rissoid mollusk, with description of two new forms. Proceeding Davenport Academy of Natural Sciences, volume V., page 9-14. Plate II., figures 11-12.

Hydrobiidae
Gastropods described in 1758
Taxa named by Carl Linnaeus